Joan Snyder (born April 16, 1940) is an American painter from New York. She is a MacArthur Fellow, a Guggenheim Fellow, and a National Endowment for the Arts Fellow (1974).

Snyder first gained public attention in the early 1970s with her gestural and elegant "stroke paintings," which used the grid to deconstruct and retell the story of abstract painting. By the late seventies, Snyder had abandoned the formality of the grid. She began more explicitly incorporating symbols and text, as the paintings took on a more complex materiality. These early works were included in the 1973 and 1981 Whitney Biennials and the 1975 Corcoran Biennial.

"The functions of Ms. Snyder's art, first and foremost, are to further the tradition of painting and to explore the most serious aspects of the human condition; to connect us not only to one another and to nature but to ancient rites and myths. She reminds us that no matter how modern and civilized we are, art can still be raw, primitive and talismanic. Without apologies or decorum, Ms. Snyder's work awakens all of the things still wild within us." – Lance Esplund, Wall Street Journal

Often referred to as an autobiographical or confessional artist, Snyder's paintings are narratives of both personal and communal experiences. Through a fiercely individual approach and persistent experimentation with technique and materials, Snyder has extended the expressive potential of abstract painting, inspiring generations of emerging artists.

Snyder currently lives and works in Brooklyn and Woodstock, NY. She is represented by Canada in New York, NY, Franklin Parrasch Gallery in New York, NY, Parrasch Heijnen Gallery in Los Angeles, CA, Elena Zang Gallery in Woodstock, NY, and Anders Wahlstedt Fine Art in New York, NY.

Early life and education 
Joan Snyder was born on April 16, 1940, in Highland Park, New Jersey.  She received her BA in Sociology, from Douglass College in 1962 and her MFA from Rutgers University in 1966.

Personal life 
In 1969, Snyder married photographer Larry Fink. She gave birth to their daughter, Molly, in 1979. They were divorced in 1985. Her grandson Elijah was born in 2012.

In 2011, Snyder married her partner of 28 years, Margaret Cammer,  a retired New York State Acting Supreme Court Judge and the former NY Deputy Administrative Judge of The New York City Civil Court.

Work 
While living on a New Jersey farm in 1962, Snyder worked in a studio on the Raritan River in New Brunswick, creating some of her earliest paintings of farm and landscape scenes, as well as expressionist portraits. In the mid to late 60's she was working explicitly with the idea of female sensibility, using materials in her paintings such as lentil seeds, flocking, thread, glitter and gauze. Snyder describes her processes involving non-art materials as a type of ritual act for the painting. Snyder's ideas often take form in her paintings through other means other than paint such as music, poetry and words to further push the intent of her pieces. These works eventually led to Snyder's seminal stroke paintings in the late 60's and early '70's.  Snyder worked alongside artists such as Mary Heilmann, Jennifer Bartlett and Harriet Korman during the 1960s, all of whom were attempting to bring more process into their art making.

Stroke paintings 

In the early 1970s, Snyder began to explore paint as subject, reconstructing abstract painting through gestural strokes on canvas over a gridded background. These paintings, more commonly known as her 'stroke' paintings, were included in the 1973 and 1981 Whitney Biennials as well as the Corcoran Biennial in 1975.

Following the stroke paintings in the mid 70s, Snyder's work once again revisited female sensibility and the work more vigorously explored materiality. By the late 70s she abandoned the formality of the grid and began to more explicitly incorporate symbols and text in her paintings.

The feminist movement
In 1971, Snyder founded the Mary H. Dana Women Artist Series, "the oldest continuous running exhibition space in the United States dedicated to making visible the work of emerging and established contemporary women artists."

She became a contributing member of Heresies, a Feminist Publication On Art and Politics, alongside artists and critics including Ida Applebroog, Joyce Kozloff, Lucy Lippard, Nina Yankowitz, Joan Braderman, Sue Heinemann and Miriam Schapiro, among many others.

Awards 
Snyder is the recipient of a 1974 National Endowment for the Arts Fellowship, a 1983 John Simon Guggenheim Memorial Fellowship, a 2007 MacArthur Fellowship, and a 2016 Arts & Letters Award in Art from the American Academy of Arts & Letters.

Collections 
Snyder's work can be found in many public collections including:

 Art Institute of Chicago, Chicago, IL
 Brooklyn Museum, Brooklyn, NY
 Dallas Museum of Art, Dallas, TX
 Guggenheim Museum, New York, NY
 Harvard Art Museums, Cambridge, MA
 High Museum of Art, Atlanta, GA
 The Jewish Museum, New York, NY
 The Metropolitan Museum of Art, New York, NY
 Museum of Fine Arts, Boston, MA
 The Museum of Modern Art, New York, NY
 National Gallery of Art, Washington, DC
 National Museum of Women in the Arts, Washington, DC
 Neuberger Museum, State University of New York at Purchase, NY
 The Phillips Collection, Washington, DC
 Rose Art Museum, Brandeis University, Waltham MA
 San Francisco Museum of Modern Art, San Francisco, CA
 Smith College Museum of Art, Northampton, MA
 Speed Art Museum, Louisville, KY
 Tang Museum, Skidmore College, Saratoga Springs, NY
 Tate Modern, London, England
 University of Arizona Museum of Art, Tucson, AZ
 Virginia Museum of Fine Arts, Richmond, VA
 Whitney Museum of American Art, New York, NY
 Wichita Art Museum, Wichita, KA
 Zimmerli Art Museum, Rutgers University, New Brunswick, NJ

Exhibitions 

 1976: Portland Center for the Visual Arts (Portland, Oregon) mounted an exhibition titled Recent Paintings.
 1977: Wake Forest University hosted a solo exhibition of her work.
 1978: Seven Years of Work, Neuberger Museum, Purchase, N.Y. (catalogue)
 1978: solo exhibition, Women's Art Registry of Minneapolis
 1979: solo exhibition, San Francisco Art Institute
 1981: Resurrection and Studies, Matrix Gallery, Wadsworth Atheneum, Hartford, Connecticut
 1994: Joan Snyder, Painter: 1969 to Now was displayed at Parrish Art Museum in Southampton, L.I. It was an exhibition made up of the first 25 years of her life's work up until that point in her career.
 2005: The Jewish Museum in New York City presented a 35-year survey of Snyder's work that traveled to the Danforth Museum of Art in Framingham, Massachusetts. The exhibition was accompanied by a monograph, Joan Snyder, with an introduction by Norman Kleeblatt and essays by Hayden Herrera and Jenni Sorkin.
 2011: Dancing With The Dark: Joan Snyder Prints 1963-2010 opened at the Zimmerli Art Museum at Rutgers University, New Brunswick, NJ, and traveled to Boston University Art Gallery, Boston, MA; University of Richmond Museums, Richmond, VA; University of New Mexico Art Museum, Albuquerque, NM accompanied by a comprehensive exhibition catalogue with an essay by the curator, Marilyn Symmes.
 2015: Sub Rosa opened at Franklin Parrasch Gallery in Manhattan NY, an exhibition of recent work. An exhibition catalogue with an essay by Joan Snyder was published in conjunction with the exhibition.
 2018: her painting Smashed Strokes Hope (1971) was included in Epic Abstraction: Pollock to Herrera, a major exhibition at The Metropolitan Museum of Art, New York, NY.
 2019: Blain|Southern presented Rosebuds & Rivers , Joan Snyder's first solo exhibition in the UK, composed of new and recent paintings.  A monograph, Joan Snyder: Rosebuds & Rivers, was published on the occasion of the show, and features essays by Craig Burnett, art critic Rhonda Lieberman and an artist interview with Mary Schneider Enriquez, Associate Curator of Modern and Contemporary Art at Harvard Art Museums.

References

External links 
 Joan Snyder Website
Joan Snyder at ArtCyclopedia
 Joan Snyder at Artnet
 Interview with Phong Bui
Oral history interview with Joan Snyder, 2010 February 25-26, Archives of American Art, Smithsonian Institution

1940 births
Living people
American contemporary painters
Bisexual women
Bisexual artists
Jewish American artists
Jewish painters
American LGBT artists
MacArthur Fellows
Artists from New York (state)
20th-century American painters
21st-century American painters
American women painters
LGBT people from New York (state)
LGBT people from New Jersey
20th-century American women artists
21st-century American women artists
Heresies Collective members
21st-century American Jews